Federal Medical Centre, Keffi is a federal government of Nigeria medical centre located in Keffi, Nasarawa State, Nigeria. The current chief medical director is Yahaya Baba Adamu.

History 
Federal Medical Centre, Keffi was established in 1957. The hospital was formerly known as General Hospital, Keffi.

CMD 
The current chief medical director is Yahaya Baba Adamu.

References 

Hospitals in Nigeria